Baldassarre Cossa (c. 1370 – 22 December 1419) was Pisan antipope John XXIII (1410–1415) during the Western Schism. The Catholic Church regards him as an antipope, as he opposed Pope Gregory XII whom the Catholic Church now recognizes as the rightful successor of Saint Peter. He was also an opponent of Antipope Benedict XIII, who was recognized by the French clergy and monarchy as the legitimate Pontiff.

Cossa was born in the Kingdom of Naples. In 1403, he served as a papal legate in Romagna. He participated in the Council of Pisa in 1408, which sought to end the Western Schism with the election of a third alternative pope. In 1410, he succeeded Antipope Alexander V, taking the name John XXIII.  At the instigation of Sigismund, King of the Romans, Pope John called the Council of Constance of 1413, which deposed John XXIII and Benedict XIII, accepted Gregory XII's resignation, and elected Pope Martin V to replace them, thus ending the schism. John XXIII was tried for various crimes, though later accounts question the veracity of those accusations. Towards the end of his life Cossa restored his relationship with the Church and was made Cardinal Bishop of Frascati by Pope Martin V.

Early life 
Baldassarre Cossa was born on the island of Procida in the Kingdom of Naples, the son of Giovanni Cossa, lord of Procida. Initially he followed a military career, taking part in the Angevin-Neapolitan war. His two brothers were sentenced to death for piracy by Ladislaus of Naples.

He studied law at the University of Bologna and obtained doctorates in both civil and canon law. Probably at the prompting of his family, in 1392 he entered the service of Pope Boniface IX, first working in Bologna and then in Rome. (The Western Schism had begun in 1378, and there were two competing popes at the time, one in Avignon supported by France and Spain, and one in Rome, supported by most of Italy, Germany and England.) In 1386 he is listed as canon of the cathedral of Bologna. In 1396, he became archdeacon in Bologna. He became Cardinal deacon of Saint Eustachius in 1402 and Papal legate in Romagna in 1403. Johann Peter Kirsch describes Cossa as "utterly worldly-minded, ambitious, crafty, unscrupulous, and immoral, a good soldier but no churchman". At this time Cossa also had some links with local robber bands, which were often used to intimidate his rivals and attack carriages. These connections added to his influence and power in the region.

Role in the Western Schism

Council of Pisa 
Cardinal Cossa was one of the seven cardinals who, in May 1408, withdrew their allegiance from Pope Gregory XII, stating that he had broken his solemn oath not to create new cardinals without consulting them in advance.  In company with those cardinals who had been following Antipope Benedict XIII of Avignon, they convened the Council of Pisa, of which Cossa became a leading figure. The aim of the council was to end the schism; to this end they deposed both Gregory XII and Benedict XIII and elected a new pope Alexander V in 1409. Gregory and Benedict ignored this decision, however, so that there were now three simultaneous claimants to the papacy.

Election to the papacy 
Alexander V died soon after, and on 25 May 1410 Cossa was consecrated a pope, taking the name John XXIII. He had become an ordained bishop only one day earlier. John XXIII was acknowledged as pope by France, England, Bohemia, Portugal, parts of the Holy Roman Empire, and numerous Northern Italian city states, including Florence and Venice and the Patriarchate of Aquileia; and in the beginning and in 1411-1413 by Hungary and Poland. However, the Avignon Pope Benedict XIII was regarded as pope by the Kingdoms of Aragon, Castile, Sicily and Scotland. Gregory XII was still favored by Ladislaus of Naples, Carlo I Malatesta, the princes of Bavaria, Louis III, Elector Palatine, and parts of Germany and Poland. John XXIII made the Medici Bank the bank of the papacy, contributing considerably to the family's wealth and prestige.

The main enemy of John was Ladislaus of Naples, who protected Gregory XII in Rome. Following his election as pope, John spent a year in Bologna and then joined forces with Louis II of Anjou to march against Ladislaus. An initial victory proved short-lived and Ladislaus retook Rome in May 1413, forcing John to flee to Florence. In Florence he met Sigismund, King of the Romans. Sigismund wanted to end the schism and urged John to call a general council. John did so with hesitation, at first trying to have the council held in Italy (rather than in a German Imperial City, as Sigismund wanted). The Council of Constance was convened on 30 October 1414. During the third session, rival Pope Gregory XII authorized the council as well. The council resolved that all three popes should abdicate and a new pope be elected.

Flight from the Council of Constance 
In March, John escaped from Constance disguised as a postman. According to the Klingenberger Chronicle, written by a noble client of Frederick IV, Duke of Austria, John XXIII travelled down the Rhine to Schaffhausen in a boat, while Frederick accompanied him with a small band of men on horseback. There was a huge outcry in Constance when it was discovered that John had fled, and Sigismund was furious about this setback to his plans for ending the Schism. The King of the Romans issued orders to all the powers on the Upper Rhine and in Swabia stating that he had declared Frederick to be an outlaw and that his lands and possessions were forfeit. In due course this led to a great deal of political upheaval and many Austrian losses in the region, notably in Aargau to the Swiss Confederation.

In the meantime, Antipope John XXIII and Frederick fled further downriver along the Rhine to the town of Freiburg im Breisgau, which recognised the duke of Austria as its lord. There Sigismund's lieutenant Ludwig III, Elector Palatine caught up with them. He convinced Frederick that he stood to lose too much by harbouring the fugitive pope, and the Austrian duke agreed to give himself and John up and return to Constance.

Deposition 
During his absence John was deposed by the council, and upon his return he was tried for heresy, simony, schism and immorality, and found guilty on all counts. The 18th century historian Edward Gibbon wrote, "The more scandalous charges were suppressed; the vicar of Christ was accused only of piracy, rape, sodomy, murder and incest." John was given over to Ludwig III, Elector Palatine, who imprisoned him for several months in Heidelberg and Mannheim.
The last remaining claimant in Avignon, Benedict XIII, refused to resign and was excommunicated. Martin V was elected as new pope in 1417.

Death and burial 

Cossa was again imprisoned in Germany. He was freed in 1418 after a heavy ransom was paid by the Medici. He went to Florence, where he submitted to Martin V, who made him Cardinal Bishop of Frascati. Cossa died only a few months later.

The Medici oversaw the construction of his magnificent tomb by Donatello and Michelozzo in the Battistero di San Giovanni in Florence. Pope Martin V protested in vain against the inscription on the sarcophagus: "John the former pope".

J.P. Kirsch remarks that "Undeniably secular and ambitious, his moral life was not above reproach, and his unscrupulous methods in no wise accorded with the requirements of his high office ... the heinous crimes of which his opponents in the council accused him were certainly gravely exaggerated." One historian concluded that John was "a great man in temporal things, but a complete failure and worthless in spiritual things".

Fictional depictions
John is portrayed by Steven Waddington in the 2016 television series Medici: Masters of Florence.
John is also a main character in A Trembling Upon Rome by Richard Condon.

The 1932 thriller Safe Custody by Dornford Yates, references John. Listing the members of an objectionable family, a character in the story says:

"Then we come to his nephew—a promising lad of fifteen. He lies, steals, smells, assaults the servants and abuses any animal which he is satisfied will not retaliate. If Gibbon may be believed, Pope John the Twenty-third as a stripling must have resembled him".

Russian writer Dmitry Balashov wrote the novel Baltazar Kossa (Бальтазар Косса) about Antipope John XXIII.

Numbering issues 

He should not be confused with Pope John XXIII of the twentieth century. When Angelo Roncalli was elected pope in 1958, there was some confusion as to whether he would be John XXIII or John XXIV; he then declared that he was John XXIII to put this question to rest. There was no John XX, since that number was skipped due to an error by Medieval Pope John XXI; this is why Gibbon refers to the antipope John as John XXII.

See also

 Papal selection before 1059
 Papal conclave (since 1274)

References

Sources

Further reading 
In 1983 political satirist/novelist Richard Condon (The Manchurian Candidate) wrote A Trembling Upon Rome, a novel of historical fiction about the life of Baldassare Cossa.

1370s births
1419 deaths
Popes who abdicated
People from the Province of Naples
Antipopes
Cardinal-bishops of Frascati
Cardinal-nephews
Deans of the College of Cardinals
15th-century antipopes
14th-century Italian Roman Catholic bishops